Theydon Bois ( or ) is a village and civil parish in the Epping Forest district of Essex, England. The population was 4,062 as at the 2011 Census.

Theydon Bois is inside the M25 motorway near to its junction with the M11 motorway. It is served by Theydon Bois tube station on the Central line and has one primary school, Theydon Bois County Primary School. It lies on the edge of Epping Forest. It also has the Theydon Bois Interchange.

A notable characteristic of the village is its almost complete absence of street lighting. Villagers have consistently voted against the installation of such lighting for decades, fearing that it would damage the traditional village ambience and require a rise in council tax. Only the approach to the tube station features a small number of lampposts.

History
Theydon first occurs as Thecdene in 1062; it probably comes from Old English thæc + denu 'valley where thatching materials are got'.  The second part of the name refers to the family of Bois (de Bosco), which held the manor in the 12th and 13th centuries. For the village name, the pronunciation is either "boyce" or "boys". When the Great Eastern Railway built its branch to Ongar, it asked the clerk of the Epping Parish Council, John Windas, how it should be spelled. As he had some knowledge of French and in view of the village's proximity to the forest, he suggested the best spelling would be 'Bois'.

Theydon Hall, which is on the site of the ancient manor house, is south of the green on the Abridge road. Theydon Hall was the manor house until early in the 17th century. The old parish church was nearby, demolished in 1843.

The Avenue of Trees

What is widely regarded as Theydon Bois' most iconic landmark is the 'Avenue of Trees' which lines Loughton Lane, one of its main roads. The oak trees were planted in the 1830s to, reputedly, celebrate the accession of Queen Victoria to the throne. Chairwoman of the City of London's Epping Forest Committee, said, “The Theydon avenue [has been] identified as the highest priority among the many other avenues of trees that the City of London currently looks after."

A recent survey commissioned by the City of London, the responsible authority for the Green, found that four of the trees were required to be felled and others should be monitored.

Although felling was accepted as necessary, there was local concern about the visual impact that this would have on the village. A new line of trees, therefore, was planted in late 2010, set back from the current row. The semi-mature replacements will eventually dominate the site. The TBPC chairman, Robert Glozier, said, "The Avenue of Trees is an intrinsic part of the village. It has to be preserved not just for the short term but also the long term and the best way to do this is to have a parallel Avenue of Trees to take over".

Some of the new trees have been sponsored as memorials, and details of these will be printed on an information board near the avenue.

Events
Several yearly events are observed in Theydon Bois. Of most note is the annual tradition of the Donkey Derby, which is usually held in July. The 26th consecutive event was held on 14 July 2013. The Derby involves children participating in donkey racing, which can be bet on in small-stakes. Individual races or the donkeys themselves can be sponsored in advance by villagers who are then offered the right to name the race or donkey respectively. Also included in the day are rides, games, stalls, donkey rides and food and drink tents. Profits made from the Donkey Derby are raised for the Theydon Bois Scouts, although have recently begun to benefit the local Girl Guides as well. The Donkey Derby was postponed from July until September for the first time in 2012 due to bad weather, although the rescheduled event also suffered from heavy rain and wind.

Another annual tradition is the Open Gardens Day, which is held in the summer. The event, which is now in its 30th year, allows local residents to show private gardens to both local and external visitors.

Theydon Bois and Epping Forest

Epping Forest, an ancient woodland and former Royal Forest, borders Theydon Bois. The Theydon Bois & District Rural Preservation Society was founded to preserve the rural character of the countryside in and around the village.

Awards

 Winner, Rural Community Council of Essex 'Essex Best Kept village Competition (Class 2)', 2004
 Winner, Rural Community Council of Essex 'Essex Best Kept village Competition (Class 2)', 2007
 Runner up, Rural Community Council of Essex 'Essex Best Kept village Competition (Class 2)', 2010
 Third Place, Essex Community Magazine Awards for 'Best Community Magazine in Essex' (Theydon Bois village News), 2015
 Winner, Essex Community Magazine Awards for 'Best Community Magazine in Essex' (Theydon Bois village News), 2013 
 Third Place, Essex Community Magazine Awards for 'Best Community Magazine in Essex' (Theydon Bois village News), 2012
 Winner, Essex Community Magazine Awards for 'Best Community Magazine in Essex' (Theydon Bois village News), 2011 
 Winner, Essex Community Magazine Awards for 'Best Community Magazine in Essex' (Theydon Bois village News), 2010 
 Third Place, Essex Community Magazine Awards for 'Best Community Magazine in Essex' (Theydon Bois village News), 2009 
 Winner, Essex Community Magazine Awards for 'Best Community Magazine in Essex' (Theydon Bois village News), 2007
Winner, Ch. Ewing Horticultural Society Award for Commitment to Greenery 2015–2021, Theydon Bois Biggest Stud award 2018–2020. 
 Winner, Essex Association of Local Councils Newsletter Award' – Essex County Council – (Theydon Bois village News), 2005
 Winner, Essex Association of Local Councils Newsletter Award' – Essex County Council – (Theydon Bois village News), 2007

Pubs
The village used to have four pubs but now only has two, the Bull and the Queen Victoria. Theydons (previously The Railway Arms) and the Sixteen String Jack were closed (in 2011 and 2016, respectively) and converted to flats.

Transport
Theydon Bois tube station is on the London Underground's Central line. There is currently one bus service connecting the village to Loughton, Abridge, Epping and Harlow.

Governance
Theydon Bois is governed locally by a Parish Council made up of 10 Councillors serving on a 4-year term with 1 of them selected as the Chairman of the council for a 12 Month Term. In Parliament it is represented by the constituency of Epping Forest.

Famous residents
 David Sullivan, millionaire publisher of Sport Newspapers former co-owner of Birmingham City Football Club and current co-owner of West Ham United Football Club, lives in Birch Hall, off Coppice Row. 
 Ray Cooney, English playwright and actor
 Paul Ballard, TV presenter and convicted rapist

References

External links

 Theydon Bois Parish Council

Epping Forest District
Villages in Essex
Civil parishes in Essex